Martin Thelander (born 15 May 1981, in Sweden) is a professional Swedish ice hockey player. He is currently playing for the BIK Karlskoga in the Swedish HockeyAllsvenskan. His former teams are Färjestad, Bofors, Södertälje, Storhamar Dragons and Herlev Hornets.

Thelander was a member of the 2008 Swedish national inline hockey team that competed at the 2008 Men's World Inline Hockey Championships in Bratislava.

External links

1981 births
Living people
Swedish ice hockey defencemen
Färjestad BK players
Herlev Hornets players
Storhamar Dragons players
Swedish expatriates in Norway